The 1967 Pan American Games, officially known as the V Pan American Games, were a continental multi-sport event held in Winnipeg, Canada, from July 22 to August 7, 1967. At the Games, 2,361 athletes selected from 29 National Olympic Committees (NOCs) participated in events in 19 sports. Twenty-one nations earned medals during the competition, and eleven won at least one gold medal.

Medal table 

The ranking in this table is based on medal counts published by several media organizations. By default, the table is ordered by the number of gold medals won by the athletes representing a nation. (In this context, a nation is an entity represented by a NOC). The number of silver medals is taken into consideration next and then the number of bronze medals. If nations are still tied, equal ranking is given and they are listed alphabetically by IOC country code.

Notes 

  Some sources appoint that the United States actually achieved 120 gold medals, 63 silver medals and 42 bronze medals, despite the majority of reports counting 128, 69 and 47, respectively. This would result in a total of 225 medals earned by American athletes during the Games.
  Some reports say that Canada earned 12 gold medals, 37 silver medals and 43 bronze medals, instead of 17, 39 and 50, respectively. This would result in a total of 92 medals earned by Canadian athletes during the Games.
  Some sources appoint that Argentina achieved 13 silver medals and 11 bronze medals, instead of 14 and 12, respectively. This would result in a total of 30 medals earned by Argentinean athletes during the Games.
  Some reports say that Cuba placed fourth in the medal table, ahead of Argentina and Mexico, after achieving 8 gold medals, 14 silver medals and 26 bronze medals. This would result in a total of 48 medals earned by Cuban athletes during the Games.

References 

General

 

Specific

See also 

Medal table
Pan American Games medal tables